"Reckless" is a song by Chris "The Glove" Taylor & David Storrs, featuring Ice-T. The song was released in 1984 on the soundtrack of Breakin'.

Track listing

Side A
Reckless (Club Mix)

Side B
Tibetan Jam

Personnel
 Tracy Lauren Marrow – vocals
Chris "The Glove" Taylor – writer, producer, performer, mixing
David Storrs – writer, producer, performer, mixing, recorder (credited as The Alien Wizard)

Legacy
During an interview on the Friday Night with Jonathan Ross on 15 May 2009, rapper Eminem said "Reckless" was the first hip-hop record he had ever heard; it inspired him to rap.

References

1984 singles
Ice-T songs
Gangsta rap songs
1984 songs
Songs written by Ice-T